Princess Alexandra of Hannover (née Princess Alexandra Sophie Cecilie Anna Maria Friederike Benigna Dorothea of Ysenburg and Büdingen; 23 October 1937 – 1 June 2015) was a German politician, philanthropist, and wife of Prince Welf Henry of Hanover. Hannover lastly served as a councilwoman representing the Niederrad district of Frankfurt on the Frankfurt City Council. She was a member of the Christian Democratic Union political party.

Personal life

Alexandra Prinzessin von Hannover was born on 23 October 1937 in Frankfurt am Main and was the second eldest child and only daughter of Otto Friedrich III, Prince of Ysenburg und Büdingen zu Wächtersbach and his wife Felicitas Anna Eleonore Cecilie, Princess Reuss of Köstritz.

Alexandra married Prince Welf Henry of Hanover, the fourth son of Ernest Augustus, Duke of Brunswick and his wife Princess Victoria Louise of Prussia, in a civil ceremony on 20 September 1960 at Büdingen, Hesse, and in a religious ceremony on the following day at the Marienkirche in Büdingen. The couple had no children.

She was the aunt of Queen Sofía of Spain and King Constantine II of Greece, and grandaunt of King Felipe VI of Spain. She died on 1 June 2015, aged 77, three days before the death of her sister-in-law Monika, Dowager Princess of Hanover.

Professional life

Alexandra represented the Frankfurt district of Niederrad on the Frankfurt City Council since 1980. She lastly served as the Chairwoman of the Culture and Leisure Committee.

Ancestry

References

External links
Christian Democratic Union (CDU) Profile on Alexandra Prinzessin von Hannover
Frankfurter Allgemeine Zeitung Article on Alexandra Prinzessin von Hannover

1937 births
2015 deaths
Politicians from Frankfurt
House of Hanover
House of Isenburg-Büdingen
Hanoverian princesses by marriage
Christian Democratic Union of Germany politicians
Princesses of Ysenburg and Büdingen
German nobility
German socialites
Officers Crosses of the Order of Merit of the Federal Republic of Germany
20th-century German women politicians
21st-century German women politicians